Lorraine Krueger (February 27, 1918 – July 15, 2003) was an American actress. She appeared in the films New Faces of 1937, Everybody's Doing It, I'm From the City, Exposed, Idiot's Delight, The Farmer's Daughter, Golden Gloves, Dance, Girl, Dance, Model Wife, Hi, Buddy, He's My Guy, Sarong Girl, The Adventures of a Rookie, Career Girl, Slightly Terrific, Out of This World and One Exciting Week, among others.

Filmography

References

External links
 

1918 births
2003 deaths
20th-century American actresses
American film actresses
21st-century American women